"For Her" is a song recorded by American country music singer Chris Lane for his 2015 extended play, Fix. It was released to digital retailers by Big Loud Records on August 29, 2016 as the record's second single. It is also included on his second studio album, Girl Problems (2016). The song was written by Kelly Archer, Sarah Buxton, and Matt Dragstrem and produced by Joey Moi.

Commercial performance
The song peaked at No. 17 on Billboards Hot Country Songs  for chart dated August 5, 2017. It has since become Lane's second top 10 on the Country Airplay chart, and his first #1 on the Canada Country chart. It has sold 780,000 copies in the United States as of July 2018.

Music video
The music video was directed by TK McKamy and premiered in September 2016.  It features a real-life proposal of marriage.

Charts

Weekly charts

Year-end charts

Certifications

References

2015 songs
2016 singles
Chris Lane songs
Songs written by Kelly Archer
Songs written by Sarah Buxton
Song recordings produced by Joey Moi
Music videos directed by TK McKamy
Big Loud singles
Songs written by Matt Dragstrem